The Moses H. Cone Memorial Hospital, also known as Moses Cone Hospital, is a 517-bed tertiary care facility located in Greensboro, North Carolina.  The hospital opened in 1953 on North Elm Street as a 310-bed community hospital.  Moses Cone Hospital is the central facility of Cone Health, a network of medical care facilities serving Guilford County and surrounding areas. As of 2019, its president is Preston Hammock.

Moses Cone Hospital is the largest hospital in its four county region (Alamance, Guilford, Randolph, and Rockingham counties).   The hospital is a designated Level II Trauma Center.

History 
Funding for a hospital began after the 1908 death of Moses H. Cone, a North Carolina magnate who founded the Cone Mills textile company.  In 1911, Bertha Cone, the widow of Moses, established a trust fund that would establish a hospital to serve  Greensboro and memorialize her late husband. The trust fund stated that "No patient should be refused admittance because of inability to pay.". After Bertha Cone's death in 1947, her inheritance went to the trust fund that would eventually establish the hospital.  Construction began in 1949 and the facility opened on February 20, 1953.

Cone was a segregated, whites-only hospital until 1963, when the Fourth Circuit Court of Appeals, in Simkins v. Moses H. Cone Memorial Hospital, held the hospital's acceptance of federal funds prohibited it from discriminating on the basis of race, an opinion influenced Title VI of the Civil Rights Act of 1964.

In the late 1970s, a dispute over payments after the completion of a new wing eventually reached the U.S. Supreme Court. By a 63 margin, the justices required the hospital to arbitrate with its contractor. The case, Moses H. Cone Memorial Hospital v. Mercury Constr. Corp., set some precedents in civil procedure, clarifying the circumstances under which a federal court can decline jurisdiction when there is a similar case in state court and when a stay may be appealed as a final judgement.

In 2013, Cone Health opened a new patient tower referred to as North Tower.   A new entrance off Church Street opened on February 1, 2014.

On February 23, 2020, maternity services moved to the campus of Moses Cone Hospital from Women's Hospital.  The new Women's & Children's Center at Moses Cone Hospital will provide maternity services, a neonatal intensive care unit and obstetrics speciality care.  The center includes its own entrance off Northwood Street with 24-hour valet service and its own parking deck.

References

External links 

Hospital buildings completed in 1953
Hospital buildings completed in 2013
Cone Health
Hospitals in Greensboro, North Carolina
Cone family
Teaching hospitals in North Carolina